Taipei 101 (stylized as TAIPEI 101), formerly known as the Taipei World Financial Center, is a  supertall skyscraper in Taipei, Taiwan. The building was officially classified as the world's tallest from its opening in 2004 until the 2009 completion of the Burj Khalifa in Dubai, UAE. Upon completion, it became the world's first skyscraper to exceed a height of half a kilometer. Taipei 101 is the tallest building in Taiwan.

The elevators of Taipei 101 that transport passengers from the 5th to the 89th floor in 37 seconds (attaining ) set speed records. In 2011, Taipei 101 was awarded a Platinum certificate rating under the LEED certification system for energy efficiency and environmental design, becoming the tallest and largest green building in the world. The structure regularly appears as an icon of Taipei in international media, and the Taipei 101 fireworks displays are a regular feature of New Year's Eve broadcasts and celebrations.

Taipei 101's postmodernist architectural style evokes traditional Asian aesthetics in a modern structure employing industrial materials. Its design incorporates a number of features that enable the structure to withstand the Pacific Ring of Fire's earthquakes and the region's tropical storms. The tower houses offices, restaurants, shops, and indoor and outdoor observatories. The tower is adjoined by a multilevel shopping mall that has the world's largest ruyi symbol as an exterior feature.

Taipei 101 is owned by Taipei Financial Center Corporation. The skyscraper opened on 31 December 2004 to celebrate New Year's Eve (2005).

History

Development 

In 1997, led by developer Harace Lin, the Taipei Financial Center Corporation, a team of several Taiwan banks and insurance companies, won the rights to lease the site for 70 years and develop a building, placing the winning bid of NT$20,688,890,000 for the Build Operate Transfer agreement with the city government. The property will return to the city in 2067.

The Taipei Financial Center Corporation (TFCC) announced plans on 2 November 2009 to make Taipei 101 "the world's tallest green building" by summer of 2011 as measured by LEED standards. The structure is already designed to be energy-efficient, with double-pane windows blocking external heat by 50 percent and recycled water meeting 20–30 percent of the building's needs. LEED certification would entail inspections and upgrades in wiring, water and lighting equipment at a cost of NT$60 million (US$1.8 million). Estimates show the savings resulting from the modifications would pay for the cost of making them within three years. The project was carried out under the guidance of an international team composed of Siemens Building Technologies, architect and interior designer Steven Leach Group and the LEED advisory firm EcoTech International. The company applied for a platinum-degree certification with LEED in early 2011. On 28 July 2011, Taipei 101 received LEED platinum certification under "Existing Buildings: Operations and Maintenance". It displaced the Bank of America Tower in Manhattan as the world's tallest and highest-use green building in addition to the Environmental Protection Agency building in Florida as the world's largest green building. Although the project cost NT$60 million (US$2.08 million), it is expected to save 14.4 million kilowatt-hours of electricity, or an 18 percent energy-saving, equivalent to NT$36 million (US$1.2 million) in energy costs each year. In 2012, the shopping center at the base is expected to be remodeled. In 2019, it was named among the 50 most influential skyscrapers in the world by the Council on Tall Buildings and Urban Habitat.

On 4 January 2020, the building had a condolence message in lights for the victims of a helicopter crash, which included a number of senior government officials. On 8 February 2020, the press said that some passengers of the Diamond Princess cruise liner, quarantined for an outbreak of Covid-19, had visited Taipei 101 on 31 January at which point none exhibited symptoms. On 1 April 2020, the Taipei 101 shopping center said it was reducing business hours due to the Coronavirus pandemic, making the "nation's first to cut back operations due to the pandemic." It had started checking shopper's temperatures in February. On 21 May the building said it would resume normal business hours in June, as the country had effectively limited the spread of COVID-19.

Timeline 

Important dates in the planning and construction of Taipei 101 include:

Construction

Planning for Taipei 101 began in July 1997 during Chen Shui-bian's term as Taipei mayor. Talks between merchants and city government officials initially centered on a proposal for a 66-story tower to serve as an anchor for new development in Taipei's 101 business district. Planners were considering taking the new structure to a more ambitious height only after an expat suggested it, along with many of the other features used in the design of the building. It was not until the summer of 2001 that the city granted a license for the construction of a 101-story tower on the site. In the meantime, construction proceeded and the first tower column was erected in the summer of 2000.

 However, an inspection showed no structural damage to the building, and construction work was able to restart within a week.

Taipei 101's roof was completed three years later on 1 July 2003. Ma Ying-jeou, in his first term as Taipei mayor, fastened a golden bolt to signify the achievement. The formal opening of the tower took place on New Year's Eve 2004. President Chen Shui-bian, Taipei Mayor Ma Ying-jeou and Legislative Speaker Wang Jin-pyng cut the ribbon. Open-air concerts featured a number of popular performers, including singers A-Mei and Stefanie Sun. Visitors rode the elevators to the Observatory for the first time. A few hours later the first fireworks show at Taipei 101 heralded the arrival of a new year.

Usages

Events and celebrity appearances 

Taipei 101 is the site of many special events. Art exhibits, as noted above, regularly take place in the Observatory. A few noteworthy dates since the tower's opening include these below:

On 28 February 2005, former President of the United States Bill Clinton visited and signed copies of his autobiography. On 19 April 2005, the tower displayed the formula "E=mc2" in lights to celebrate the 100th anniversary of the publication of Einstein's theory of relativity. The display, the largest of 65,000 such displays in 47 countries, was part of the international celebration Physics Enlightens the World. On 20 October 2006, the tower displayed a pink ribbon in lights to promote breast cancer awareness. The ten-day campaign was sponsored by Taipei 101's ownership and Estée Lauder.

On 25 December 2004, French rock and urban climber Alain Robert made an authorized climb to the top of the pinnacle in four hours. On 12 December 2007, Austrian base jumper Felix Baumgartner survived an unauthorized parachute jump from the 91st floor. On 20 November 2005, the First annual Taipei 101 Run Up featured a race up the 2,046 steps from floors 1 to 91. Proceeds were to benefit Taiwan's Olympic teams. The men's race was won by Paul Crake of Australia (10 minutes, 29 seconds), and the women's race by Andrea Mayr of Austria (12 minutes, 38 seconds). On 15 June 2008, Taipei 101 Run Up featured 2,500 participants. The men's race was won by Thomas Dold of Germany (10 minutes, 53 seconds); 2007 champion Marco De Gasperi of Italy finished second and Chen Fu-tsai of Taiwan finished third. The women's race was won by Lee Hsiao-yu of Taiwan (14 minutes, 53 seconds). On 6 December 2014, Japanese idol group HKT48 held a small concert on the 91st-floor observatory as the premiere of their tour in Taiwan.

Eve fireworks displays

The  is hosted at the Taipei City Hall, which also provides a full view of Taipei 101 which is lit up with fireworks. Another popular location for crowds to gather to see the fireworks display is the public square of Sun Yat-sen Memorial Hall. For the first three years (2004–2006), the annual fireworks show at Taipei 101 was preceded by the sequential display of numerals in lights on each section on huge panels displays to count down the last eight seconds to midnight. Since 2007 the building has been completely darkened, then fireworks begin to launch sequentially from the lower to upper sections.
 2003–2004: Building still under construction. Spinning lights on the Outdoor Observatory (floor 91) provided a display of sound and lights, but no fireworks were launched.
 2004–2005: Grand opening of Taipei 101 celebrated with the first fireworks display. The show lasted 35 seconds. Rockets were launched from section balconies. Festivities included all-day performances by famous entertainers and ceremonial visits by national dignitaries.
 2005–2006: Show extended to 128 seconds. Sony sponsored the show, which concluded with a display of the brand name in lights.
 2006–2007: Show extended to 188 seconds; 9,000 rockets were launched. This was Sony's second time sponsoring the event.
 2007–2008: Show same length but featuring 12,000 rockets. Event Sponsor Taiwan Tourism Bureau ended the show with a display, in lights, of a heart over the word 'Taiwan'.
 2008–2009: A conspicuously more modest show than those which preceded it. The theme was "Love Taiwan With Your Heart in 2009". The show ended with the four sides of the building displaying lights in four colors (red, blue, green, and yellow) to represent happiness, vision, sustainability and passion.
 2009–2010: The display regained some of the dazzle of 2005–2008 shows but remained more brief in duration. The theme was "Taiwan Up".
2010–2011: Show extended to 288 seconds (100 sec. for flash effects and 188 sec. for fireworks), and designed by Cai Guo-Qiang, the artist also responsible for Beijing Olympics and World Expo Shanghai's fireworks. The theme was "100 ROC" (100th anniversary of the Republic of China) which extended on the "Love Taiwan" theme. 2010 was also the year the Floral Expo was held in Taipei, and at Dajia Riverside Park there was another New Year's Eve event. It was a VIP event, but was broadcast simultaneously with the City Hall event. The display on the building was accompanied by fireworks going off other buildings in the Xinyi financial district. One concept was for fireworks to spiral up and down the building like dragon crawling, but technical difficulties caused some disappointment with what was anticipated (reported by the media to be more like "a worm"). 
2011–2012: The show was shortened to 202 seconds and was considered to be more conservative than that of the previous year, but featuring the largest number of rockets launched to date, totaling 30,000. The theme coincided with the 101st anniversary of the ROC. It also gained attention on YouTube, where viewers noticed an apparent "UFO" in the seconds before the fireworks started, later determined to be a radio-controlled glider with flashing lights.
2012–2013: The show was designed by the French pyrotechnics company Groupe F and was 198 seconds in length, featuring 22,000 rockets launched to an adaptation of Igor Stravinsky's The Firebird. The theme was "Swing for the Future". The words "Time for Taiwan" (both in English and Mandarin Chinese) were displayed in lights at the building to promote Taiwan Tourism Bureau's current advertising campaign.
2013–2014: The show lasted 218 seconds and a thematic music was created for the first time by local musicians to commemorate Taipei 101's 10th anniversary. 
2014–2015: Marked 10th anniversary since the official opening on 31 December 2004. The show performed for 218 seconds. iSee Taiwan Foundation sponsored the fireworks to promote the beauty of Taiwanese culture and creativity. The firework music was arranged by Taiwanese Golden Melody award winner—Mr. Lee, Che-Yi, blended with the famous classical song The four seasons by Vivaldi and many Taiwanese folk music. Performed and recorded by Taipei Symphony Orchestra.
2015–2016: It is the fourth time Group F designed the firework show for Taipei 101, with a green theme "Nature is Future" this year. The 238-second display was considered the longest performance ever. In addition to the most various and natural patterns of flowers, birds, seahorses, fish, etc. were projected, 30,000 effects were one of the most to show. It is also the first time to have professional climbers to settle the firework racks onto the building façades. Mr. Lee, Chi-Yi once again arranged the music mixed with international and Taiwanese rhythms reflecting the nature-related theme and Evergreen Symphony Orchestra played the role of performance. A young Taiwanese IT design company BungBungame became the exclusive sponsor supporting a symbolic event showing Taiwan to the world.
2020: Taipei 101 displayed a show with the theme of "Light of Hope, Taiwan", launching 16,000 fireworks at midnight.

Architecture and design

Height
Taipei 101 comprises 101 floors above ground, as well as five basement levels. The first building to break the half-kilometer mark in height, it was the world's tallest building from 31 March 2004 to 10 March 2010. , it is still the world's largest and tallest green building.

It also surpassed the 85-story,  Tuntex Sky Tower in Kaohsiung as the tallest building in Taiwan and the 51-story,  Shin Kong Life Tower as the tallest building in Taipei. Taipei 101 claimed the official records for the world's tallest sundial and the world's largest New Year's Eve countdown clock.

This lower figure is derived by measuring from the top of a  platform at the base. CTBUH standards, though, include the height of the platform in calculating the overall height, as it represents part of the man-made structure and is above the level of the surrounding pavement. Taipei 101's records for roof height and highest occupied floor briefly passed to the Shanghai World Financial Center in 2008, which in turn yielded these records as well to the Burj.

Overall, Taipei 101 was the tallest building in the world for six years, being surpassed by the Burj Khalifa in 2010. For 12 years it also had the fastest elevator, at 38 miles per hour. It also has the largest wind damper in the world, at 18 feet across. Taipei 101 is currently the eleventh-tallest building in the world, according to the Council on Tall Buildings and Urban Habitat's official rankings.

Structural design

The Taipei 101 is designed to withstand typhoon winds and earthquake tremors that are common in the area in the east of Taiwan.

Taipei 101 was designed to be flexible as well as structurally resistant, because while flexibility prevents structural damage, resistance ensures comfort both for the occupants and for the protection of the glass, curtain walls, and other features. Most designs achieve the necessary strength by enlarging critical structural elements such as bracing. Outrigger trusses, located at eight-floor intervals, connect the columns in the building's core to those on the exterior.

These features, combined with the solidity of its foundation, made Taipei 101 one of the most stable buildings ever constructed. The foundation is reinforced by 380 piles driven  into the ground, extending as far as  into the bedrock.

RWDI designed a  steel pendulum that serves as a tuned mass damper, at a cost of NT$132 million (US$4 million). Two additional tuned mass dampers, each weighing , are installed at the tip of the spire which help prevent damage to the structure due to strong wind loads. On 8 August 2015, strong winds from Typhoon Soudelor swayed the main damper by —the largest movement ever recorded by the damper.

The damper has become such a popular tourist attraction that the city contracted Sanrio to create a mascot: the Damper Baby. Four versions of the Damper Baby ("Rich Gold", "Cool Black", "Smart Silver" and "Lucky Red") were designed and made into figurines and souvenirs sold in various Taipei 101 gift shops. Damper Baby has become a popular local icon, with its own comic book and website.

Structural facade

The facade system of glass and aluminum panels installed into an inclined movement-resisting lattice contributes to overall lateral rigidity by tying back to the mega-columns with one-story high trusses at every eighth floor. The facade system is also known as a Damper.

The original corners of the facade were tested at RWDI in Ontario, Canada. A simulation of a 100-year storm at RWDI revealed a vortex that formed during a 3-second  wind at a height of 10 meters, or equivalent to the lateral tower sway rate causing large crosswind oscillations. A double chamfered step design was found to dramatically reduce this crosswind oscillation, resulting in the final design's "double stairstep" corner facade. Architect C.Y. Lee also used extensive facade elements to represent the symbolic identity he pursued. These facade elements included the green tinted glass for the indigenous slender bamboo look, eight upper outwards inclined tiers of pagoda each with eight floors, a Ruyi and a money box symbol between the two facade sections among others.

Taipei 101's own roof and facade recycled water system meets 20 to 30 percent of the building's water needs. In July 2011, Taipei 101 was certified "the world's tallest green building" under LEED standards.

Symbolism

The height of 101 floors commemorates the renewal of time: the new century that arrived as the tower was built (100+1) and all the new years that follow (1 January = 1-01). It symbolizes lofty ideals by going one better on 100, a traditional number of perfection. The number also evokes the binary numeral system used in digital technology.

The main tower features a series of eight segments of eight floors each. In Chinese-speaking cultures the number eight is associated with abundance, prosperity and good fortune.

The repeated segments simultaneously recall the rhythms of an Asian pagoda (a tower linking earth and sky, also evoked in the Petronas Towers), a stalk of bamboo (an icon of learning and growth), and a stack of ancient Chinese ingots or money boxes (a symbol of abundance). Popular humor sometimes likens the building's shape to a stack of take-out boxes as used in Western-style Chinese food; of course, the stackable shape of such boxes is likewise derived from that of ancient money boxes. The four discs mounted on each face of the building where the pedestal meets the tower represent coins. The emblem placed over entrances shows three gold coins of ancient Chinese design with central holes shaped to imply the Arabic numerals 1-0-1. The structure incorporates many shapes of squares and circles to reach a balance between yin and yang.

Curled ruyi figures appear throughout the structure as a design motif. Though the shape of each ruyi at Taipei 101 is traditional, its rendering in industrial metal is plainly modern. The ruyi is a talisman of ancient origin associated in art with heavenly clouds. It connotes healing, protection and fulfillment. It appears in celebrations of the attainment of new career heights. The sweeping curved roof of the adjoining mall culminates in a colossal ruyi that shades pedestrians.

At night the bright yellow gleam from its pinnacle casts Taipei 101 in the role of a candle or torch upholding the ideals of liberty and welcome. From 6 to 10 p.m., the tower's lights display one of seven colors, according to a weekly schedule.

From 26 February to 6 March 2022, the typical colors were replaced by blue and yellow in solidarity with Ukraine, in response to the 2022 Russian invasion of Ukraine.

The adjoining Taipei 101 on the east side connects the landmark further with the symbolism of time. The design of the circular park doubles as the face of a giant sundial. The tower itself casts the shadow to mark afternoon hours for the building's occupants. The park's design is echoed in a clock that stands at its entrance. The clock runs on energy drawn from the building's wind shear.

Taipei 101, like many of its neighboring buildings, exemplifies the influence of feng shui philosophy. An example appears in the form of a large granite fountain at the intersection of Songlian Road and Xinyi Road near the tower's east entrance. A ball at the fountain's top spins toward the tower. As a work of public art the fountain offers a contrast to the tower in texture even as its design echoes the tower's rhythms. The fountain also serves a practical function in feng shui philosophy. A T intersection near the entrance of a building represents a potential drain of positive energy, or ch'i, from the structure and its occupants. Placing flowing water at such spots is thought to help redirect the flow of ch'i.

Interior

Taipei 101 is the first record-setting skyscraper to be constructed in the 21st century. It exhibits a number of technologically advanced features as it provides a center for business and recreation.

The original 2004 fiber-optic and satellite Internet connections permitted transfer speeds up to a gigabit per second.

The double-deck elevators built by the Japanese Toshiba Elevator and Building Systems Corporation (TELC) set a new record in 2004 with the fastest ascending speeds in the world. Each elevator features an aerodynamic body, full pressurization, state-of-the art emergency braking systems, and the world's first triple-stage anti-overshooting system. The cost for each elevator is NT$80 million (US$2.4 million).

A   The damper can reduce up to 40 percent of the tower's movements. The TMD is visible to all visitors on the 87th through 91st floors.

Two restaurants have opened on the 85th floor: Diamond Tony's, which offers European-style seafood and steak, and Shin Yeh 101 (欣葉), which offers Taiwanese Hokkien cuisine. Occupying all of the 86th floor is Taiwanese restaurant Ding Xian 101. Din Tai Fung, several international dining establishments and retail outlets also operate in the adjoining mall. The multistory retail mall adjoining the tower is home to hundreds of fashionable stores, restaurants, clubs and other attractions. The mall's interior is modern in design even as it makes use of traditional elements. The curled ruyi symbol is a recurring motif inside the mall. Many features of the interior also observe feng shui traditions.

Floor directory

A tenant directory is posted in the first floor's lobby (visible from the Xinyi entrance).

The number 4 is considered an unlucky number in Chinese culture, so what would have been the 44th floor has been replaced by Level 43, with 42A replacing the actual 43 to compensate for the skipped floor number.

As of 1 January 2011, the highest occupied office floor (excluding the observatory and restaurants) was 75. The building appears to be at least 70 percent occupied at this point.

There is a freight elevator that stops at every level from B5 to 91, with a button for every floor.

The 92nd through 100th floors are officially designated as communication floors, although it is unknown if there are any radio or TV stations currently broadcasting from the top of Taipei 101. The 101st floor indoor/outdoor rooftop observatory opened to the public on 14 June 2019.

The top 10 floors are to have stated on their website to contain a radio and television relay station, Emergency system receiving/signaling relay station, telecommunications stations, and an outdoor antenna frame on 96F, which offers power, fire protection, telecom systems, and security related systems, according to their website.

The 101st floor is home to a private VIP club named Summit 101, according to the observatory brochure. Before 2014, no information about this club was ever made public. In 2014, photos of the exclusive club were shown on TV for the first time. A Taipei Financial Center Corporation spokesman said that only foreign dignitaries, Hollywood film actors, and high spenders in the Taipei 101 Mall (over NT $1 million in purchases) had been invited to the VIP club.

Access to the 101st floor requires two elevator transfers on the 89th and 93rd floors, respectively. There is only one service elevator that facilitates access to the top nine floors (93–101). The 101st floor is divided into three levels: 101F (lower), 101MF (mezzanine) and 101RF (roof). The VIP club exists on the lower level, while 101RF, a mechanical floor, provides access to the 60-meter tall spire, which has 24 levels (numbered R1 through R24) that can only be accessed via ladder.

Elevator 

The Taipei 101 includes two high-speed observatory single deck elevators manufactured by Toshiba in cooperation with Kone, which manufactured the machines in almost all of its elevators. Their highest speed is 1,010 meters per minute (about 60.6 kilometers per hour).  In 2016, the title for the fastest elevator was taken away by the Shanghai Tower in Shanghai. Shortly after, the title for the world's fastest elevator was passed on yet again to the Guangzhou CTF Finance Centre. The shuttle double deck elevators only serves 35F/36F and 59F/60F.

Floor plan

Observation deck

Taipei 101 features an indoor observation deck on the 88th and 89th floors, and two outdoor observation decks (91st floor and 101st floor), all offering 360-degree views and attract visitors from around the world. Here, one may view the skyscraper's main damper, which is the world's largest and heaviest visible damper, and buy food, drinks and gift items. Two more flights of stairs take visitors up to the Outdoor Observatory.

The Indoor Observatory is open thirteen hours a day (9:00 am–10:00 pm) throughout the week as well as on special occasions; the Outdoor Observatory is open during the same hours as weather permits. Tickets may be purchased on site in the shopping mall (5th floor) or in advance through the Observatory's website and allow access to the 88th through 91st floors via high-speed elevator.

In 2019, its 101 top floor opened for the first time to the public, starting 14 June with only 36 people given access each day. The 91st-floor observatory used to be the highest floor that open to the public until 14 June 2019 when it was announced by the building's management team that the 101st floor (at 460 m above sea level) will be opened to the general public, with a quota of 36 people per day and is subject to prior booking. Going onto the outdoor viewing platform requires safety equipment, such as a safety belt buckled to the railing.

Other features

Artworks

Many works of art appear in and around Taipei 101. These include: German artist Rebecca Horn's Dialog between Yin and Yang in 2002 (steel, iron), American artist Robert Indiana's 1-0 in 2002 and Love in 2003 (aluminum), French artist Ariel Moscovici's Between Earth and Sky in 2002 (rose de la claret granite), Taiwanese artist Chung Pu's Global Circle In 2002 (black granite, white marble), British artist Jill Watson's City Composition in 2002 (Bronze), and Taiwanese artist Kang Mu Hsiang's Infinite Life in 2013 (aluminum). Moreover, the Indoor Observatory hosts a regular series of exhibitions. The artists represented have included Wu Ching (gold sculpture), Ping-huang Chang (traditional painting) and Po-lin Chi (aerial photography).

Awards

On its opening date, Taipei 101 was awarded the Emporis Skyscraper Award, coming in 1st place.

Taipei 101 was awarded the top award platinum rating, by the Leadership in Energy and Environmental Design (LEED), the globally recognized green building ranking system of the U.S. Green Building Council (USGBC), making the skyscraper the tallest energy conservation building in the world.

In 2017, Taipei 101 was awarded the Asia Responsible Entrepreneurship Award (AREA).

Taipei 101 was awarded the CTBUH Skyscraper Award on the Performance award category.

Gallery

See also

 List of tallest buildings in Taiwan
 List of tallest buildings in Taipei
 Taipei Nan Shan Plaza
 List of tourist attractions in Taipei
 List of most expensive buildings

References

External links

 2013 Taipei 101 New Year Fireworks
 Taipei 101 Official Website
 Taipei 101 Official Website – Observatory
 Taipei 101 Official Website – Mall
 YouTube – Taipei 101 New Year Fireworks 2005, 2006, 2007, 2008
 National Geographic Channel – Richard Hammond examines Taipei 101
 Consulting services by RWDI (wind engineering and emergency ventilation) and Motioneering (tuned mass damper)
 Megastructure Supports Taipei's 508-Meter 'Megatower' by Engineering News-Record, a weekly magazine by McGraw-Hill Construction of McGraw-Hill
 LEED Official Site
 C. Y. Lee Architects Office Official Website

Further reading

 

2004 establishments in Taiwan
Buildings and structures completed in 2004
Skyscraper office buildings in Taipei
Tourist attractions in Taipei
Shopping malls in Taipei
Shopping malls established in 2004
Expressionist architecture
Former world's tallest buildings
Xinyi Special District
High-tech architecture
Postmodern architecture